Ambatondrazaka Airport is an airport in Ambatondrazaka, Alaotra-Mangoro Region, Madagascar .

Airlines and destinations

References 

Airports in Madagascar
Alaotra-Mangoro